Ian McAndrew (born 23 February 1989 in Gosford, New South Wales) is an Australian footballer. He also represented the Australian Futsalroos at the 2010 Asian Cup in Uzbekistan, earning 3 caps. His only appearance in the A-League came against the Wellington Phoenix at Westpac Stadium in October 2007. Ian continues to play local football on the Central Coast and has been on the fringes of the Australian futsal team. Ian is well known for docking his players at training on the Central Coast. Recently Ian's Gosford Premier League Squad achieved much success with Premier League and Reserve Grade winning League Champions and 3rd Grade being crowned Premiers. Ian continuously proves to be a sought after and elite player wherever he plays. McAndrews recent move to Wyoming FC has been seen as very successful due to his heavy emphasis on youth production, his star young gun Conor Fitzpatrick impressing on many occasions in the First Grade squad.

Honours
With Central Coast Mariners FC:
  A-League Premiership: 2007-2008

With Gosford City FC:
  Central Coast First Division Premiership and Promotion Central Coast First Division 2012

External links

1989 births
Living people
Australian soccer players
A-League Men players
Central Coast Mariners FC players
Australian men's futsal players
Association football midfielders
Mounties Wanderers FC players
People from Gosford
Sportsmen from New South Wales
Soccer players from New South Wales